Embassy of Sweden in Bangkok is Sweden's diplomatic mission in Thailand. The ambassador is also accredited to the Philippines, Laos and Burma.

Buildings
Between 1931 and 1959, Sweden had a non-resident ambassador accredited to Thailand from Japan and China. In July 1959, an agreement was reached between the Swedish and Thai governments on the mutual elevation of the respective countries' legations to embassies. In connection with this, Tord Hagen was appointed Sweden's first ambassador in Bangkok.

In the 1960s, the embassy was located on 231/2 Sathon Tai Road. By the 1970s, the embassy had moved to Silom Building at 197/1 Si Lom Road. , the embassy is located on the 8th Floor at One Pacific Place, 140 Sukhumvit Road.

Heads of Mission

Footnotes

References

External links
 Embassy of Sweden in Bangkok

Bangkok
Sweden–Thailand relations
Sweden